Agustín Fernández Díaz-Pavón (born 11 May 1938) is a Spanish long-distance runner. He competed in the marathon at the 1972 Summer Olympics and the 1976 Summer Olympics.

References

External links
 
 
 

1938 births
Living people
Spanish male long-distance runners
Spanish male marathon runners
Olympic athletes of Spain
Athletes (track and field) at the 1972 Summer Olympics
Athletes (track and field) at the 1976 Summer Olympics
Place of birth missing (living people)